Riverview Gardens School District is a public school district in north St. Louis County, Missouri, United States.

The district serves all or parts of Bellefontaine Neighbors, Dellwood, Ferguson, Moline Acres, and Riverview.

The district has 13 schools within the district: 10 elementary schools, two middle schools, and one high school. Riverview Gardens is a Title One school district: all students receive free or reduced lunch. Riverview Gardens School District states that its mission is to create scholars who are career ready and college ready. The school district is currently unaccredited but has received a provisional unit 2020. The average teacher salary is $49,000.

List of schools
High schools
 Riverview Gardens High School

Middle schools
 Central Middle School
 Westview Middle School

Elementary schools
 Danforth Elementary School
 Gibson Elementary School
 Glasgow Trails Elementary School
 Gibson Elementary School
 Koch Elementary School
 Leamasters  Elementary School
 Lewis and Clark Elementary School
 Meadows Elementary School
 Moline Elementary School

References

External links
 

School districts in Missouri
Education in St. Louis County, Missouri